Tunahan Kuzu (born 5 June 1981) is a Turkish-born Dutch politician. He is a former member of the Labour Party (PvdA). He has been an MP since 20 September 2012. On 13 November 2014 Kuzu and Selçuk Öztürk left the Labour Party and formed the Group Kuzu/Öztürk, later renamed DENK ("Think"). On 18 November 2014, he became Parliamentary group leader. In the 2017 Dutch general election, the party secured three seats in the House of Representatives.

Early life
Kuzu grew up in Maassluis and studied public administration at Erasmus University Rotterdam. He worked as a health care advisor for PricewaterhouseCoopers, and was also a member of the municipal council of Rotterdam from 2008 to 2012.

Controversies

Relations with Israel
Kuzu attracted international attention in September 2016 when he refused to shake the hand of Prime Minister of Israel Benjamin Netanyahu before a meeting at the States General of the Netherlands. In a statement posted to Facebook Kuzu explained his action as a protest against human rights abuses committed against Palestinian civilians in the Palestinian territories.

In May 2019, during a visit to Jerusalem to learn about the situation of the Palestinians in Israel, Kuzu was held up on the Temple Mount while carrying a Palestinian flag. According to Farid Azarkan, Kuzu was "taken by a large group of heavily armed soldiers". Kuzu was not arrested, however, he was stopped and released after an hour.

Electoral history

References 
  Parlement.com biography

1981 births
Living people
21st-century Dutch politicians
DENK politicians
Dutch management consultants
Dutch Muslims
Dutch people of Turkish descent 
Dutch political party founders
Erasmus University Rotterdam alumni
Independent politicians in the Netherlands
Labour Party (Netherlands) politicians
Leaders of political parties in the Netherlands
Members of the House of Representatives (Netherlands)
Municipal councillors of Rotterdam
People from Maassluis
Turkish emigrants to the Netherlands